Thomas Aldrich(e), Aldridge or Aldredge may refer to:

 Thomas Bailey Aldrich (1836–1907), American writer, poet, critic and editor
Thomas Aldriche (by 1515–1562), English politician
Thomas Aldridge (born 1982), English actor
Tommy Aldridge (born 1950), American drummer
Tom Aldredge (1928–2011), American actor
Thomas Aldrich (academic) (died 1576), English priest and academic 
Thomas A. Aldrich (1923–2019), United States Air Force general